The Apalachee River is a  tributary of the Oconee River in the U.S. state of Georgia.  It rises north of Lawrenceville in eastern Gwinnett County and flows southeast to join the Oconee River in Lake Oconee west of Greensboro.

It is spanned by the Kilgore Mill Covered Bridge.

See also
List of rivers of Georgia

References 

 
 USGS Hydrologic Unit Map - State of Georgia (1974)

Rivers of Georgia (U.S. state)
Rivers of Gwinnett County, Georgia
Rivers of Greene County, Georgia